Just Go may refer to:

 Just Go (album), an album by Lionel Richie, 2009
 "Just Go" (Lionel Richie song), the title song
 Just Go (Goodbye's the New Hello), the debut studio album by Rania, 2013
 "Just Go" (JHETT song), 2005
 "Just Go" (Staind song), 1999
 "Just Go", a song by Jesse McCartney from Right Where You Want Me, 2006